EuropeanIssuers is an association representing the interests of publicly quoted companies on European stock exchanges. Since 2008, its objective has been to ensure that European Union policy creates an environment in which companies can raise capital through the public markets and deliver growth over the longer term.

Overview
The lobby association is registered in the European Transparency Register with the European Commission and Parliament. EuropeanIssuers' members include listed companies and national associations of listed companies from 15 European countries which represents approximately 8,000 companies.

EuropeanIssuers’ vision is to be a major contributor to the organisation and competitiveness of EU capital markets. EuropeanIssuers defends that thanks to an adapted regulatory environment and a better access to finance European quoted companies, notably SMEs, will be able to better compete globally and deliver growth and jobs.

Following the 2019 European elections, EuropeanIssuers released its 2019-2024 Vision which is articulated around 6 key objectives and 21 specific actions.

To have more information on EuropeanIssuers activities on 2019, please refer to the Annual Report 2019.

History
Founded in 2008, as the result of a merger between two associations of listed companies, EuropeanIssuers was created as a not-for-profit association when EALIC, the European Association of Listed Companies, joined with UNIQUE, the Union of Issuers Quoted in Europe.

Leadership
EuropeanIssuers is led by a Board of Directors. Luc Vansteekiste serves as chairman since 2014.

The association is administrated by a secretary general. Florence Bindelle holds this position since 2015. Past secretary generals are Dorien Fransens (2008–2010) and Susannah Haan (2010-2015).

Working Bodies 
EuropeanIssuers' working bodies consist of the Policy Committee, the Smaller Issuers Committee and Working Groups.

The Policy Committee is the main technical working body of the association. It is composed of senior legal and technical experts who are delegated by our members and bring in strong expertise and first hand practical experience. The Policy Committee, that convenes on a bi-monthly basis, monitors and discusses all developments of possible concern to issuers. It drafts the position papers in which EuropeanIssuers publicly expresses its members’ views.

The Smaller and Medium Issuers Listed in Europe Committee, created in 2008, focuses on the specific needs of smaller listed companies. The Smaller Issuers Committee was set up in reaction to the increase of de-listings and the decrease of new listings, due to the ever-growing volume of regulations for listed companies. The goal of the Smaller Issuers Committee is to improve and facilitate the access for smaller issuers to capital markets. There is a need to make it more attractive for an average size company to have its shares listed and publicly traded. Lighter and better regulation for smaller issuers is the main objective. It aims at getting formal recognition by the EU of smaller issuers as a specific sector between SMEs and the largest listed companies in view of benefiting from a “lighter touch regime”. The Committee holds quarterly meetings in different locations in the Europe.

EuropeanIssuers' currently active Working Groups are: EMIR, Smaller Issuers, Corporate Reporting, Supervisory Reporting, Capital Markets Union, Securities Law & Markets' Infrastructure, Corporate Governance, Public Country-by-Country Reporting, Prospectus, Market Abuse, Company Law, Corporate Bonds and Financial Transaction Tax. Only direct members of EuropeanIssuers are eligible to participate in Working Groups.

Activities 
EuropeanIssuers co-organises the European Small and Mid-Cap Awards along with the European Commission and the Federation of European Securities Exchanges (FESE) since 2013. The Awards are organised to encourage the growth of smaller companies' stock listing, particularly SMEs and growth companies. The Awards showcase the diversity of European markets and aim to promote stock listings, in particular targeting SMEs and growth companies. These companies are critical to European economic recovery and to accomplishing the EU’s goals of job creation, competitiveness and growth.

EuropeanIssuers organised EuropeanIssuers Capital Markets Forum on 4 and 5 December in 2018 in Brussels, Belgium on the occasion of 10 years anniversary. The EuropeanIssuers Capital Markets Forum, organised to commemorate this milestone, provided both a forward looking and a retrospective overview of the EU regulatory developments. It also offered a platform to exchange views and ensure that EU policy creates an environment in which companies of all sizes can easily raise capital through the public markets and deliver growth and jobs over the longer term.

In 2020, EuropeanIssuers launched EuropeanIssuers Capital Markets Webinar Series. The webinar series addresses the major regulatory developments that are affecting quoted companies in today’s environment. Its aim is to create an atmosphere of exchange with peers and with policymakers to shape a competitive and sustainable environment for our businesses in Europe. EuropeanIssuers Capital Markets Webinars gather audience from a broad cross-sectorial of senior company’s representatives from General Counsels, Heads of Legal, Investors Relations, Company Secretaries, CFO’s to many European leading corporations as well as regulators, consultants, exchanges, bankers, financial press and other service providers.

The organisation is also on the events planning committee for the first inaugural Invest Week 2016, a series of events focused on the European investment and growth agenda.

EuropeanIssuers organised the EuropeanIssuers Advisory Council twice a year since 2018. The EuropeanIssuers Advisory Council brings together around 50 senior executives (Chief Executives, Board Members etc.) of major multinational companies in Europe in a wide range of industrial sectors with high level policy-makers. The Advisory Council is composed by representatives from companies across Europe such as; UCB, Solvay, ING, L'Oréal, AXA, Engie, BNP Fortis Paribas, Total, Novartis, ENI, Generali, Banco Santander, Ericsson, Philips, Unilever and many more. This networking platform aims to provide the European Business leaders the opportunity to discuss the most compelling topics of the European agenda in the field of financial markets with relevant business implications, through a direct dialogue and a privileged interaction with European institutions' top officials and thought leaders. The Advisory Council serves the purpose of strengthening the dialogue between business and politics whilst improving the quality of EC policy proposals following the debates. The Advisory Council is chaired by Mr Etienne Davignon, Belgian politician, businessman, and former vice-president of the European Commission. The Council previously welcomed prestigious guests such as Mr Peter Praet, former executive board member and chief economist of the European Central Bank and Executive Vice President for an Economy that Works for People, Valdis Dombrovskis on 16 June 2020. The Advisory Council met Commissioner for Justice, Didier Reynders on 29 October 2020. The meetings are supported by EuropeanIssuers' partner EY.

Membership
Companies listed on European stock exchanges as well as national associations of listed companies form the direct membership base of EuropeanIssuers. EuropeanIssuers also offers associate membership.

References

External links
 Official website
 European Transparency Register

2008 establishments in Belgium
Lobbying firms
Lobbying in Europe
Lobbying in the European Union
Organizations established in 2008
Organisations based in Brussels
Pan-European trade and professional organizations